Solomon White,  (October 8, 1836 – November 11, 1911) was an Ontario lawyer and political figure. He represented Essex North in the Legislative Assembly of Ontario from 1878 to 1886 and from 1890 to 1894 as a Conservative member.

He was born on the Anderdon Huron reserve near Amherstburg, Upper Canada and was the son of Joseph White, a chief of the Wyandot, and Angélique Fortier. White was called to the bar in 1865 and entered practice at Windsor with John O'Connor, a fellow Catholic. He married Mary L. Drew in 1867. In 1868, he moved to Cooksville, where he purchased the Claire House vineyards and established a winery. White ran unsuccessfully in Peel for a seat in the provincial assembly in 1873. In 1876, he returned to Windsor where he resumed the practice of law and also operated a farm. In 1877, he and the majority of the members of the Anderdon reserve became enfranchised after a collective vote. He was first elected in an 1878 by-election held after James Colebrooke Patterson was elected to the federal parliament. White was defeated by Gaspard Pacaud in 1886 but elected again in 1890. He married Elizabeth Whitmore in 1898.

Unlike other Conservatives, White supported French language instruction in Ontario schools and annexation to the United States. He also defended native land claims in Ontario and voting rights for native peoples. White served as mayor of Windsor in 1890.

In 1905, White moved to the silver mining town of Cobalt and set up a law practice there. He was named a King's Counsel in 1908. In 1911, he was elected mayor of Cobalt but died later that year.

External links
Biography at the Dictionary of Canadian Biography Online

The Canadian parliamentary companion, 1885 JA Gemmill
Commemorative biographical record of the county of Essex, Ontario ... (1905)

1836 births
1911 deaths
Canadian King's Counsel
First Nations politicians
Mayors of Windsor, Ontario
People from Cobalt, Ontario
Progressive Conservative Party of Ontario MPPs